Xanthocanace is a genus of beach flies in the family Canacidae. All known species are Oriental, Palearctic, or Afrotropical.

Species
X. capensis Wirth, 1956
X. hamifer Munari, 2008
X. kaplanorum Mathis and Freidberg, 1982
X. magna (Hendel, 1914)
X. nigrifrons Malloch, 1924
X. orientalis Hendel, 1913
X. pollinosa Miyagi, 1963
X. ranula (Loew, 1874)
X. sabroskyi Mathis and Freidberg, 1982
X. seoulensis Miyagi, 1963
X. zeylanica Delfinado, 1975

References

Canacidae
Carnoidea genera
Taxa named by Friedrich Georg Hendel